APFEL is an opensource software able to perform Dokshitzer–Gribov–Lipatov–Altarelli–Parisi (DGLAP) evolution up to next to next to leading order (NNLO) in quantum chromodynamics (QCD) and to leading order (LO) in quantum electrodynamics (QED), both with pole and minimal subtraction scheme (MSbar) masses. The coupled DGLAP QCD+QED evolution equations are solved in x-space by means of higher order interpolations and Runge-Kutta techniques, and allow the exploration of different options for the treatment of subleading terms.

Main features

See also

NNPDF

References

External links
 APFEL website

Physics software